Leucosyris is a genus of flowering plants belonging to the family Asteraceae.

Its native range is southwestern and southern-central United States to Mexico.

Species:

Leucosyris arida 
Leucosyris blepharophylla 
Leucosyris carnosa 
Leucosyris coulteri 
Leucosyris crispa 
Leucosyris mattturneri 
Leucosyris parviflora 
Leucosyris riparia 
Leucosyris turneri

References

Astereae
Asteraceae genera